The 1976 Cincinnati Bengals season was the franchise's 7th season in the National Football League, and the 9th overall.

Paul Brown had announced his retirement after 41 seasons of coaching and named Bill Johnson, his longtime assistant, as the successor over future San Francisco Head coach Bill Walsh. Brown continued to serve as the club's general manager and vice president. The Bengals acquired defensive end Coy Bacon in a trade with San Diego and drafted halfback Archie Griffin, the two-time Heisman Trophy winner from Ohio State. The Bengals won nine of their first 11 games and finished 10–4, but did not make the playoffs.

Offseason

NFL Draft

Personnel

Staff

Regular season

Schedule

Standings

Team stats

Team leaders 
 Passing: Ken Anderson (338 Att, 179 Comp, 2367 Yds, 53.0 Pct, 19 TD, 14 Int, 76.9 Rating)
 Rushing: Boobie Clark (151 Att, 671 Yds, 4.4 Avg, 24 Long, 7 TD)
 Receiving: Isaac Curtis (41 Rec, 766 Yds, 18.7 Avg, 85 Long, 6 TD)
 Scoring: Chris Bahr, 81 points (14 FG; 39 PAT)

Roster

Awards and records 
 Ken Riley, Franchise Record, Most Interceptions in One Season, (9)

Pro Bowl Selections 
 QB Ken Anderson
 DE Coy Bacon
 S Tommy Casanova
 WR Isaac Curtis
 LB Jim LeClair
 CB Lemar Parrish

References 

 Bengals on Pro Football Reference
 Bengals Schedule on jt-sw.com
 Bengals History on Official Site

Cincinnati Bengals
Cincinnati Bengals seasons
Cincinnati